Melissa Ingram (born 24 June 1985 in Henderson, New Zealand) is a retired New Zealand swimmer. She won a bronze medal with Lauren Boyle, Helen Norfolk and Alison Fitch in the 4 × 200 m freestyle relay at the 2006 Commonwealth Games.

Ingram competed at the 2008 Summer Olympics and the 2012 Summer Olympics. She announced her retirement on 15 March 2013.

References

External links 
 
 

1985 births
Living people
New Zealand female swimmers
Olympic swimmers of New Zealand
Commonwealth Games bronze medallists for New Zealand
Swimmers at the 2008 Summer Olympics
Swimmers at the 2012 Summer Olympics
Swimmers at the 2002 Commonwealth Games
Swimmers at the 2006 Commonwealth Games
People from the Auckland Region
Medalists at the FINA World Swimming Championships (25 m)
Commonwealth Games medallists in swimming
Universiade medalists in swimming
Swimmers from Auckland
Universiade silver medalists for New Zealand
Medalists at the 2005 Summer Universiade
Medalists at the 2007 Summer Universiade
Medalists at the 2011 Summer Universiade
Medallists at the 2006 Commonwealth Games